Codringtonia eucineta is a species of air-breathing land snail, a terrestrial pulmonate gastropod mollusc in the family Helicidae, the typical snails.

Geographic distribution
C. eucineta is endemic to Greece, where it occurs in the central part of south Peloponnese and in Evrytania.

References

Codringtonia
Molluscs of Europe
Endemic fauna of Greece
Gastropods described in 1857
Taxonomy articles created by Polbot